Valley Ridge is a residential neighbourhood in the northwest quadrant of Calgary, Alberta, Canada. It is located at the western edge of the city, south of the Bow River and north of the Trans-Canada Highway. The Valley Ridge golf course is located in the northern part of the community. The community is located on the former site of the Happy Valley Campground a fun park with slides, which was a major destination for visitors to Calgary until it was closed in the 1980s; the campground was located where the golf course is now situated.

Demographics

Residents in this community had a median household income of $144,800 in 2010, and there were 4.9% low income residents living in the neighbourhood. As of 2010, 17% of the residents were immigrants. Consisting mostly of single-family detached homes, only 1.4% of the housing is used for renting.

See also
List of neighbourhoods in Calgary

References

External links
Federation of Calgary Communities - Valley Ridge  Community

Neighbourhoods in Calgary